Pristimantis silverstonei, also known as Silverstone's Robber Frog, is a species of frog in the family Strabomantidae. It is endemic to the Pacific slope of the Cordillera Occidental in the Valle del Cauca and Chocó Departments, Colombia. The specific name silverstonei honors , an American botanist and herpetologist.

Habitat and conservation
Development is direct (i.e., there is no free-living larval stage).

A formerly common species, Pristimantis silverstonei has undergone a decline that took place in the mid–late 1990s and is possibly caused by chytridiomycosis. There are some indications that the populations might be recovering. Nevertheless, also habitat loss remains a threat. It occurs in two protected areas: Cerro El Inglés Natural Reserve and Tatamá National Natural Park. Its range is also close to the Farallones de Cali National Natural Park.

References

silverstonei
Amphibians of the Andes
Amphibians of Colombia
Endemic fauna of Colombia
Amphibians described in 1996
Taxa named by John Douglas Lynch
Taxonomy articles created by Polbot